Pernem railway station (Station code: PERN) is a railway station in North Goa district of Goa state.

Administration 
It falls under the jurisdiction of Konkan Railway. It is in Pernem town of North Goa district of Goa State and is under Karwar railway division of Konkan Railway zone, a subsidiary zone of Indian Railways.

Structure 
As of 2016, a single broad-gauge railway line exists at this station, and 14 trains stop at Pernem.

Location 
Pernem (also spelt locally as Pednem) is one of the smaller railway stations of Goa. Madgaon (Margao) railway station in South Goa district is the largest, while Thivim railway station in North Goa is the second-largest. The former is a gateway to South Goa, Margao, the urban area of Vasco da Gama and also the beaches of South Goa, while the latter is a gateway to Mapusa town, the emigration-oriented sub-district of Bardez and also the North Goa beach belt. Karmali railway station, another station in Central Goa, is closest to the State-capital of Panaji or Panjim.

However, the Pernem railway station is closest to the beaches of the extreme end of North Goa (within Pernem taluka) such as Arambol or Harmal, Mandrem, Morjim, Tiracol, among others, which are also popular destinations, specially for alternative tourists.

References

Railway stations in North Goa district
Railway stations along Konkan Railway line
Railway stations opened in 1997
Karwar railway division